Maternalist Reforms in the United States were experiments in public policy beginning in the late 19th and early 20th century that took the form of laws providing for state assistance to mothers with young children lacking the financial support of a male member of the household. This assistance took the form of financial reimbursements, as well as limits on the maximum working hours for women. These reforms arose from the belief that government has an obligation and interest in protecting and improving the living standards of women and children.

Maternalism is defined by historians Seth Koven and Sonya Michel as a variety of ideologies that "exalted women's capacities to mother and extended to society as a whole the values of care, nurturance and morality", and was intended to improve the quality of life of women and children. To improve the conditions of women and children these policies attempted to reconcile the conflicting roles placed on women during this time period. As single mothers were responsible for both supporting their families and raising children, government assistance would reduce the probability that they could be charged with neglecting their "home duties".

History

Emergence
Maternal public policy emerged in the United States following the landmark United States Supreme Court decision Muller v. Oregon, 208 U.S. 412 (1908). This case upheld the constitutionality of a law that limited the maximum working hours of women, qualifying the previous Lochner v. New York, 198 U.S. 45 (1905), in which setting maximum working hours for men was held to be unconstitutional, by ruling that the state was allowed to intervene in matters related to women's working hours due to "the difference between the sexes". The decision in Muller was based on a scientific and sociological study that demonstrated that the government has a legitimate interest in the working conditions of women as they have the unique ability to bear children. By the turn of the century, a middle-class women's movement emerged based on the ethos of maternalist reform.

Despite not having yet gained the constitutional right to vote, these women were able to exert their influence on public policy, as is particularly demonstrated in the successes of the Progressive Era maternalist reformers, whose initiatives helped establish the federal Children's Bureau, pass the Sheppard-Towner Infancy and Maternity Protection Act, and expand mothers' pensions to most states. Maternalist precepts would continue to shape American welfare policies thereafter due to activism and came to succeed in three overlapping categories: child protection, social housekeeping, and maternal and child welfare.  Maternalist reformers viewed women as "social mothers" who are called to clean up political corruption so they aggressively pushed for maternalist policies to become laws, usually with provisions for female administrators. They also worked to achieve civil service reform and were also involved in promoting food and drug policies. By drawing from the association to motherhood—that mothers were responsible for protecting citizens within the home—the reformers made political demands with great efficacy.

Maternalist reform began to be employed as an analytical tool to explain the modern welfare states in the United States and Western Europe in the early 1990s. This was facilitated by a Koven and Michel article, which compared the maternal welfare provisions in the U.S., United Kingdom, Germany, and France, effectively introducing maternalism to welfare scholarship. Later scholarship tackling the same subject revealed that paternalist welfare policies, which were designed by male bureaucrats to benefit male workers and their dependents, prevailed in England, whereas the maternalist welfare policies initiated by female reformers to address the specific plights of women thrived in the United States.

Successes and limitations
While maternalist reforms won protection for working people during a time in which labor movements made few gains and asserted the right of women to participate in the public realm, they also perpetuated ideas harmful to the advancement of women to a point of equality with men, eliciting criticism from growing numbers of feminists during the period. Some of these ideas include the belief that all women ought to be mothers and that ideally men should be financially supporting the family.

There were also strong pushbacks to maternalist reform in the United States. The most significant of these came from opponents who attacked it as living proof of a socialist infiltration of the U.S. government. These attacks were effective in undermining some previous successes, as for example the repeal of the Sheppard-Towner Infancy and Maternity Protection Act as well as prevention of the maternalist hopes of incorporating universal health coverage into the New Deal.

Individuals and organizations
Individual reformers who were advocates of maternalist policies include:
 Ellen Gates Starr
 Florence Kelley, founder of the National Consumers League and factory inspector, called on middle class women to boycott products made by women and children in sweatshops.
 Jane Addams
 Josephine Clara Goldmark
 Julia Lathrop
 Lillian Wald
 Sophonisba Breckinridge

Organizations and institutions who supported maternalist reforms:
 General Federation of Women's Clubs
 Hull House
 National Consumers League
 United States Children's Bureau

References

Women's rights in the Americas